Joseph Thomas "Cuddy" Murphy (May 15, 1897 – May 22, 1940) was a professional American football player who played guard for two seasons for the Canton Bulldogs and Cleveland Tigers.

Murphy served as the head basketball coach at the University of Maine from 1923 to 1925.

References

1897 births
1940 deaths
American football guards
Basketball coaches from New Hampshire
Canton Bulldogs players
Cleveland Indians (NFL) players
Dartmouth Big Green football players
Maine Black Bears men's basketball coaches
Sportspeople from Concord, New Hampshire